Methylbenzenediol, also known as dihydroxytoluene, may refer to:

 3-Methylcatechol (3-methylbenzene-1,2-diol or 2,3-dihydroxytoluene)
 4-Methylcatechol (4-methylbenzene-1,2-diol or 3,4-dihydroxytoluene)
 2-methylbenzene-1,3-diol
 4-methylbenzene-1,3-diol
 Orcinol (5-methylbenzene-1,3-diol or 3,5-dihydroxytoluene)
 2-methylbenzene-1,4-diol
 3-methylbenzene-1,4-diol

See also 
 Cresol (methylphenol, hydroxytoluene)
 Trihydroxytoluene